The Chapel of Our Lady of Sion is a Catholic chapel located in an old building of the sisters of the Congregation of Our Lady of Sion in the western hill of Ein Karem, a neighborhood in the District of Jerusalem, Israel.

The convent complex was inaugurated in 1860 and is managed by Catholic nuns since 1861. The temple is under the jurisdiction of the Latin Patriarchate of Jerusalem, which was established in its modern form in 1847 by Pope Pius IX.

Gallery

See also
Roman Catholicism in Israel
Latin Patriarchate of Jerusalem

References

Roman Catholic chapels in Jerusalem
Roman Catholic churches completed in 1860
19th-century Roman Catholic church buildings in Israel